The 2000 United States Senate election in Massachusetts was held on November 7, 2000. It ran concurrently with the U.S. presidential election and elections to the U.S. Senate in other states, as well as elections to the House of Representatives and various state and local elections.

Incumbent Democratic U.S. Senator Ted Kennedy easily won re-election to his eighth (a seventh full) term. For only the second (and final) time in his career, Kennedy polled more than 70% of the vote.

The election was notable for a strong third-party performance from Libertarian Carla Howell, who finished less than a percent behind Republican Jack E. Robinson III. The divided opposition enabled Kennedy to record his highest-ever margin of victory, although he recorded a higher percentage of the popular vote in 1964, and also to win every municipality in the state for the only time in his career.

General election

Candidates
 Dale E. Friedgen (Independent)
 Carla Howell, political activist and small government advocate (Libertarian)
 Philip Hyde III (Timesizing Not Downsizing)
 Ted Kennedy, incumbent U.S. Senator since 1962 (Democratic)
 Philip F. Lawler (Constitution)
 Jack E. Robinson III, perennial candidate (Republican)

Results

See also 
 2000 United States Senate elections

References 

Massachusetts
2000
United States Senate